Liferea (short for Linux Feed Reader) is a news aggregator for online news feeds and podcasts. It supports the major feed formats including RSS/RDF and Atom and can import and export subscription lists in OPML format. Liferea is intended to be a fast, easy to use, and easy to install news aggregator for GTK+ that can be used with the GNOME desktop. Liferea features a script manager, in which users can add custom scripts that run whenever a certain action occurs.

Pronunciation
The lead programmer of Liferea, Lars Windolf, who is German, pronounces the name of the software .

Distinguishing features

To easily read linked articles or weblog comments, Liferea allows reading websites using an embedded WebKit-based browser. Additionally, the user can configure an external browser (e.g. Firefox, Web, Konqueror) with which to open links.

It supports a number of different feed formats including RSS/RDF, CDF, Atom, OCS, and OPML, many of which its contemporaries cannot.

By sorting subscriptions into folders, the user can read all headlines of a folder at once. By enabling a filtering preference, all previously read headlines of the folder can be hidden.

Similar to the mail client Evolution, Liferea supports search folders, which allow the user to save searches. Each search folder contains all headlines that match its user-defined search rules.

Liferea can synchronize with online services such as Tiny Tiny RSS and The Old Reader to allow reading news feeds from multiple devices.

Browser integration
In Web there is a news feed subscription extension, which allows adding news feeds when viewing websites.

For Firefox 1.5+ there is an extension (FeedBag) that allows adding subscriptions by simple clicking the LiveBookmarks icons in the Firefox address bar.

Since Firefox 2.0+, Liferea can be used without a special extension. To subscribe to new feeds from within Firefox, the Liferea helper script "liferea-add-feed" has to be configured in the Firefox feed subscription preferences.

See also

 Comparison of feed aggregators

References

External links 

Atom (Web standard)
GNOME Applications
News aggregators that use GTK
Free software programmed in C
News aggregator software
Applications using D-Bus